Narraweena is a suburb of northern Sydney, in the state of New South Wales, Australia. Narraweena is 18 kilometres north-east of the Sydney central business district, in the local government area of Northern Beaches Council and is part of the Northern Beaches region.

Narraweena has two primary schools; Narraweena Public School and St John the Apostle Narraweena Catholic School.

History

Narraweena is an Aboriginal name meaning  a quiet place in the hills. The suburb developed after World War II, when the land was subdivided, Narraweena Post Office opening on 1 April 1953.

Italian people from Pazzano since the 1980s have organised an annual Santo Salvatore's fiest, with a statue very similar to the original that is taken from the catholic church of Narraweena around the suburb and back.

References

Suburbs of Sydney
Northern Beaches Council